Amstrad was a British electronics company, founded in 1968 by Alan Sugar at the age of 21. The name is a contraction of Alan Michael Sugar Trading. It was first listed on the London Stock Exchange in April 1980. During the late 1980s, Amstrad had a substantial share of the PC market in the UK. Amstrad was once a FTSE 100 Index constituent, but since 2007 has been wholly owned by Sky UK. , Amstrad's main business was manufacturing Sky UK interactive boxes. In 2010, Sky integrated Amstrad's satellite division as part of Sky so they could make their own set-top boxes in-house.

The company had offices in Kings Road, Brentwood, Essex.

History

1960s and 1970s 

Amstrad (also known as AMSTrad) was founded in 1968 by Alan Sugar at the age of 21, the name of the original company being AMS Trading (Amstrad) Limited, derived from its founder's initials (Alan Michael Sugar). Amstrad entered the market in the field of consumer electronics. During the 1970s they were at the forefront of low-priced hi-fi, TV and car stereo cassette technologies. Lower prices were achieved by injection moulding plastic hi-fi turntable covers, undercutting competitors who used the vacuum forming process.

Amstrad expanded to the marketing of low cost amplifiers and tuners, imported from East Asia and badged with the Amstrad name for the UK market. Their first electrical product was the Amstrad 8000 amplifier.

1980s 

In 1980, Amstrad went public trading on the London Stock Exchange, and doubled in size each year during the early '80s. Amstrad began marketing its own home computers in an attempt to capture the market from Commodore and Sinclair, with the Amstrad CPC range in 1984. The CPC 464 was launched in the UK, Ireland, France, Australia, New Zealand, Germany, Spain and Italy. It was followed by the CPC 664 and CPC 6128 models. Later "Plus" variants of the 464 and 6128, launched in 1990, increased their functionality slightly.

In 1985, the popular Amstrad PCW range was introduced, which were principally word processors, complete with printer, running the LocoScript word processing program. They were also capable of running the CP/M operating system. The Amsoft division of Amstrad was set up to provide in-house software and consumables.

On 7 April 1986 Amstrad announced it had bought from Sinclair Research "the worldwide rights to sell and manufacture all existing and future Sinclair computers and computer products, together with the Sinclair brand name and those intellectual property rights where they relate to computers and computer related products", which included the ZX Spectrum, for £5 million. This included Sinclair's unsold stock of Sinclair QLs and Spectrums. Amstrad made more than £5 million on selling these surplus machines alone. Amstrad launched two new variants of the Spectrum: the ZX Spectrum +2, based on the ZX Spectrum 128, with a built-in cassette tape drive (like the CPC 464) and, the following year, the ZX Spectrum +3, with a built-in floppy disk drive (similar to the CPC 664 and 6128), taking the 3" disks that many Amstrad machines used.

In 1986 Amstrad entered the IBM PC-compatible arena with the PC1512 system. In standard Amstrad livery and priced at £399 it was a success, capturing more than 25% of the European computer market. It was MS-DOS-based, but with the GEM graphics interface, and later Windows. In 1988 Amstrad attempted to make the first affordable portable personal computer with the PPC512 and 640 models, introduced a year before the Macintosh Portable. They ran MS-DOS on an 8 MHz processor, and the built-in screen could emulate the Monochrome Display Adapter or Color Graphics Adapter. Amstrad's final (and ill-fated) attempts to exploit the Sinclair brand were based on the company's own PCs; a compact desktop PC derived from the PPC 512, branded as the Sinclair PC200, and the PC1512 rebadged as the Sinclair PC500.

Amstrad's second generation of PCs, the PC2000 series, were launched in 1989. However,
due to a problem with the Seagate ST277R hard disk shipped with the PC2386 model, these had to be recalled and fitted with Western Digital controllers. Amstrad later successfully sued Seagate, but following bad press over the hard disk problems, Amstrad lost its lead in the European PC market.

1990s 

In the early 1990s, Amstrad began to focus on portable computers rather than desktop computers. In 1990, Amstrad tried to enter the video game console market with the Amstrad GX4000, similar to what Commodore did at the same time with the C64 GS. The console, based on the Amstrad 464 Plus hardware, was a commercial failure, because it used outdated technology, and most games available for it were straight ports of CPC games that could be purchased for much less in their original format.

In 1993, Amstrad was licensed by Sega to produce a system which was similar to the Sega TeraDrive, going by the name of the Amstrad Mega PC, to try to regain their image in the gaming market. The system didn't succeed as well as expected, mostly due to its high initial retail price of £999. In that same year, Amstrad released the PenPad, a PDA similar to the Apple Newton, and released only weeks before it. It was a commercial failure, and had several technical and usability problems. It lacked most features that the Apple Newton included, but had a lower price at $450.

As Amstrad began to concentrate less on computers and more in communication, they purchased several telecommunications businesses including Betacom, Dancall Telecom, Viglen Computers, and modem manufacturer Dataflex Design Communications, bought out of liquidation, during the early 1990s. The company also established a direct marketing channel, Amstrad Direct, in late 1994 and announced 486- and Pentium-based products including an "All-in-One Multimedia PC" with built-in television tuner, infra-red remote control, amplifier and speakers. A pen-based personal digital assistant with support for a PCMCIA-based modem, the InfoPad, was also unveiled with a September 1995 launch scheduled.

Amstrad has been a major supplier of set top boxes to UK satellite TV provider Sky since its launch in 1989. Amstrad was key to the introduction of Sky, as the company was responsible for finding methods to produce the requisite equipment at an attractive price for the consumer - Alan Sugar famously approached "someone who bashes out dustbin lids", to manufacture satellite dishes cheaply. Ultimately, it was the only manufacturer producing receiver boxes and dishes at the system's launch, and has continued to manufacture set top boxes for Sky, from analogue to digital and now including Sky's Sky+ digital video recorder.

By 1996, Alan Sugar was reported as having been looking for a buyer for Amstrad "for some time". Despite "long drawn out negotiations", the parties failed to agree a price and a strategy to dispose of the group's other assets. In 1997, Amstrad PLC was wound up, its shares being split into Viglen and Betacom instead. Betacom PLC was then renamed Amstrad PLC.

The same year, Amstrad supplied set top boxes to Australian broadcaster Foxtel, and in 2004 to Italian broadcaster Sky Italia.

21st Century 

In 2000, Amstrad released the first of its combined telephony and e-mail devices, called the E-m@iler. This was followed by the E-m@iler Plus in 2002, and the E3 Videophone in 2004. Amstrad's UK E-m@iler business is operated through a separate company, Amserve Ltd which is 89.8% owned by Amstrad and 10.2% owned by DSG International plc (formerly Dixons plc).

Amstrad has also produced a variety of home entertainment products over their history, including hi-fi, televisions, VCRs, and DVD players.

BSkyB takeover 

In July 2007, BSkyB announced a takeover of Amstrad for £125m, a 23.7% premium on its market capitalisation. BSkyB had been a major client of Amstrad, accounting for 75% of sales for its 'set top box' business. Having supplied BSkyB with hardware since its inception in 1988, market analysts had noted the two companies becoming increasingly close.

Sugar commented that he wished to play a part in the business, saying: "I turn 60 this year and I have had 40 years of hustling in the business, but now I have to start thinking about my team of loyal staff, many of whom have been with me for many years."

It was announced on 2 July 2008 that Sugar had stepped down as Chairman of Amstrad, which had been planned since BSkyB took over in 2007.
Amstrad was taken off the Stock Exchange on 9 October 2008.

Amstrad has ceased operations as a trading company, and now exists in name only. Under Sky, Amstrad currently only produce satellite receivers for Sky, as doing so allows them to reduce costs by cutting out the middleman. Amstrad's former offices are now a Premier Inn Hotel.

Sky bought Amstrad so they could have their own hardware development division to develop new Satellite boxes (Sky Q) made in-house.

Computer product lines

Home computers 

 CPC464 (64 KB RAM, cassette drive)
 CPC472 (same as CPC464 but with 72 KB instead of 64 KB)
 CPC664 (3 inch internal disk variant of CPC464)
 CPC6128 (128 KB version of the CPC664 with 3 inch disk)
 464 Plus (CPC464 with enhanced graphics and sound)
 6128 Plus (CPC6128 with enhanced graphics and sound)
 GX4000 (games console based on 464 Plus)
 Sinclair ZX Spectrum +2 (re-engineered ZX Spectrum 128 with tape drive)
 Sinclair ZX Spectrum +3 (as ZX Spectrum +2 but with 3 inch disk drive instead of tape drive)

Word processors 

 PCW8256 (Z80, 3.5 MHz, 256 KB RAM, single 180 KB 3" floppy drive, dot-matrix printer, green screen)
 PCW8512 (same as PCW8256 but with 512 KB RAM, 180 KB 3" A: drive, 720 KB 3" B: drive)
 PCW9512 (Z80, 3.5 MHz, 512 KB RAM, single or dual 720 KB 3" floppy drives, daisywheel printer, "paper white" screen)
 PcW9256 (Z80, 3.5 MHz, 256 KB RAM, single 720 KB 3.5" floppy drive, dot-matrix printer, "paper white" screen)
 PcW9512+ (same as PCW9512 but with single 3.5" 720 KB floppy drive)
 PcW10 (same as PcW9256 but with 512 KB RAM and a built-in parallel port)
 PcW16 (Z80, 16 MHz, single 1.44 MB 3.5" floppy drive, new machine not directly compatible with old PCWs)

Notepad computers 

 NC100 (Z80, 64 KB RAM, 80×8 character LCD)
 NC150 (NC100 with 128 KB RAM, floppy disk interface and NC200 firmware — sold in France and Italy)
 NC200 (Z80, 128 KB RAM, adjustable 80×16 character LCD, 3.5 in floppy disk drive)

PC compatibles 

 PC1512 (Intel 8086, 8 MHz, 512 KB RAM, enhanced CGA graphics up to 640x200x16) - Marketed in the United States as the PC5120
 PC1640 (Intel 8086, 8 MHz, 640 KB RAM, MDA/Hercules/CGA/EGA colour graphics) - Marketed in the United States as the PC6400
 PPC512 (Portable using NEC V30 processor, 512 KB RAM, non-backlit supertwist CGA, one or two 720 KB 3.5" floppy drives) - released around the same time as the PC1512.
 PPC640 (Portable using NEC V30 processor, 640 KB RAM, non-backlit supertwist CGA, one or two 720 KB 3.5" floppy drives, internal modem) - released around the same time as the PC1640.
 Sinclair PC200 (integral desktop PC for home computer market based on PPC512)
 PC-20 the Australian and USA version of the Sinclair PC200 except that the USA version does not have a RF modulator.
 Sinclair PC500 (rebadged PC1512)
 PC1286
 PC1386 (Intel 80386SX CPU, 20 MHz, 1 MB RAM)
 PC2086 (Intel 8086 CPU, 8 MHz, 640 KB RAM, VGA graphics) launched 1989
 PC2286 (Intel 80286 CPU, 12.5 MHz, 1 MB RAM, VGA graphics) launched 1989
 PC2386 (Intel 80386DX CPU, 20 MHz, 4 MB RAM, VGA graphics) launched 1989.
 PC3086 ( 8 MHz 8086 CPU, 640 KB RAM)
 PC3286 (16 MHz 80286 CPU, 1 MB RAM)
 PC3386SX (20 MHz 80286SX CPU, 1 MB RAM)
 PC4386SX (20 MHz 80386SX CPU, 4 MB RAM)
 PC5086 (8 MHz 8086 CPU, 640 KB RAM)
 PC5286 (16 MHz 80286 CPU, 1 MB RAM)
 PC5386SX (20 MHz 80386SX CPU, 2 MB RAM, VGA graphics) launched 1991
 PC6486SX
 PC7000 series: PC7286, PC7386SX, PC7486SLC
 PC8486
 PC9486 (25 or 33 MHz 80486SX, or 50 MHz 80486DX2)
 PC9486i (66 MHz 80486DX2 CPU, 4 MB RAM)
 PC9555i (120 MHz Pentium)
 Amstrad Mega PC (Intel 80386SX CPU, 25 MHz, Integrated Mega Drive)
 ALT286 (laptop; 16 MHz 80286 CPU, 1 MB RAM)
 ALT386SX (laptop; 16 MHz 80386SX CPU, 1 MB RAM)
 ACL386SX (laptop; 20 MHz 80386SX CPU, 1 MB RAM, colour TFT LCD)
 ANB386SX (notebook; 80386SX CPU, 1 MB RAM)

PC accessories 

 Amstrad DMP1000 9-pin dot matrix printer
 Amstrad DMP3000, DMP3160, DMP3250di 9-pin dot matrix printer (different printing speed), the special model 3250di (dual interface) having both serial and parallel ports
 Amstrad SM2400 2400 baud internal modem (came with Mirror software)

PDA 
 PDA 600 Pen Pad (1993, Z8S180 CPU)

Set-top box
 Amstrad/Fidelity Satellite Systems  SRX100 (1989), SRX200 (1989), SRD400 (1990)
 Amstrad Sky box DRX100 (2001), DRX200 (2001), DRX300 (2003), DRX400 (2004), DRX500 (2004), DRX550, (2006)
 Amstrad Sky+ box DRX180 (2003), DRX280 (2003)
 Amstrad Sky+HD box DRX780 (2007), DRX890, DRX895 (2009)
 Amstrad Sky HD Multiroom Receiver DRX595 (2011)

See also 

 Amsoft
 PC-1512
 Amstrad Action
 Amstrad NC150
 Amstrad NC200
 Amstrad NC100

References

Further reading 

 Sugar, Alan. What You See Is What You Get: My Autobiography (2010) hardback 
 Thomas, David. Alan Sugar: The Amstrad Story (1991), paperback .

External links 

 

 
Electronics companies established in 1968
Home computer hardware companies
Electronics companies of the United Kingdom
Computer companies of the United Kingdom
Companies formerly listed on the London Stock Exchange
Companies based in Brentwood, Essex
1968 establishments in England
Defunct computer hardware companies